is a train station located in Fushimi-ku, Kyoto, Kyoto Prefecture, Japan.

Lines
Keihan Electric Railway
Uji Line

History
The station opened on June 1, 1913, simultaneously with the opening of the Uji Line.

Adjacent stations

References

Railway stations in Japan opened in 1913
Railway stations in Kyoto